Linkwood is an unincorporated community in Dorchester County, Maryland, United States. Linkwood is located at the intersection of U.S. Route 50 and Linkwood Road, southeast of Cambridge and northwest of Vienna.

References

Unincorporated communities in Dorchester County, Maryland
Unincorporated communities in Maryland